Ziabar (also Romanized as Ẕīābar, Zeyābar, Ẕīā’ Bar, and Zīyā’ Bar; also known as Ziabera) is a village in Ziabar Rural District, in the Central District of Sowme'eh Sara County, Gilan Province, Iran. At the 2006 census, its population was 3,388, in 970 families.

References 

Populated places in Sowme'eh Sara County